Eliton Pardinho Toreta Júnior (born 26 January 1998), commonly known as Eliton Júnior, is a Brazilian professional footballer who plays as a midfielder for Swedish club Varberg.

Career
Born in São Mateus, Espírito Santo, Eliton had a nomadic youth career with spells at Fragata, Flamengo and Náutico before he joined Bulgarian club Lokomotiv Plovdiv at the age of 20 in February 2018.

Eliton made his debut for the senior team on 25 February 2018 in a 1–1 draw away to Slavia Sofia, replacing Dimo Bakalov.

On 14 January 2022, Eliton signed a four-year contract with Varberg in Sweden.

Career statistics

Club

Honours

Club
Lokomotiv Plovdiv
 Bulgarian Cup: 2018–19

References

External links
 

1998 births
Living people
Brazilian footballers
Association football midfielders
PFC Lokomotiv Plovdiv players
Red Bull Brasil players
Varbergs BoIS players
First Professional Football League (Bulgaria) players
Allsvenskan players
Brazilian expatriate footballers
Expatriate footballers in Bulgaria
Brazilian expatriate sportspeople in Bulgaria
Expatriate footballers in Sweden
Brazilian expatriate sportspeople in Sweden